The Wisconsin Wilderness were an American Junior ice hockey team based in Spooner, Wisconsin.  The Wilderness played in the Canadian-based Superior International Junior Hockey League.

History
In the summer of 2012, Donnie Roberts sold the original Wisconsin Wilderness, two-time SIJHL Bill Salonen Cup champions, to parties who moved the team to Cloquet, Minnesota. Built from the success of the original Minnesota Wilderness, they won their third straight title and the Dudley Hewitt Cup as Central Canada Junior A champions. They became the second team in SIJHL history to play for the Royal Bank Cup and the first American team in Canadian Junior A history to make the final round of the national playdowns.  During this time, the Wilderness announced that the team was leaving the SIJHL and joining the North American Hockey League. The Wilderness would lose their chance at the 2013 Royal Bank Cup in the semi-final, in overtime.

On July 11, 2013, USA Hockey granted Lars Geary a new team in the SIJHL.  Geary chose to go back to the previous franchise's name, the "Wisconsin Wilderness".

On September 21, 2013, the Wilderness played their first franchise game. The Wilderness traveled to Dryden, Ontario, to play the Dryden Ice Dogs and lost the game, 4–1.  Zach Kraft scored the first goal in Wilderness history 11:36 into the first period.  Luke Thompson made 37 saves in the effort for the Wilderness.  The next night was the second game of a weekend doubleheader with the Ice Dogs, as the Wilderness avenged their previous loss and picked up their first franchise win with a 6–3 triumph.  Sawyer Jacobson picked up the eventual game-winning goal 5:19 into the third period, while Luke Thompson made 35 saves to pick up the historic victory.

After their first season returning to the SIJHL, the Spooner Ice House closed its doors, leaving the Wisconsin Wilderness without an arena and therefore they folded.

Season-by-season results

Playoffs
 2014 Lost quarter-final
 Minnesota Iron Rangers defeated Wisconsin Wilderness 4-games-to-none

References

External links
 Wilderness Webpage
 Superior International JHL Webpage

Amateur ice hockey teams in Wisconsin
Defunct Superior International Junior Hockey League teams
Washburn County, Wisconsin
2012 establishments in Wisconsin
2013 disestablishments in Wisconsin
Ice hockey clubs established in 2012
Ice hockey clubs disestablished in 2013